Vietnam Veterans may refer to:

The Vietnam Veterans, a French psychedelic musical group
Vietnam veteran, a phrase used to describe someone who served in the armed forces of participating countries during the Vietnam War